Bend Sinister is a dystopian novel written by Vladimir Nabokov during the years 1945 and 1946, and published by Henry Holt and Company in 1947. It was Nabokov's eleventh novel and his second written in English.

Title
In heraldry, a standard "bend" is a diagonal band from the upper dexter to the lower sinister (that is, from the upper right of the coat of arms' bearer to his lower left) and a "bend sinister" is its left-handed reverse. To a viewer facing the shield the appearances will be reversed, \ and / respectively. In a 1963 edition of the book, Nabokov explains that "this choice of a title was an attempt to suggest an outline broken by refraction, a distortion in the mirror of being, a wrong turn taken by life." In the novel, Nabokov often uses word-play concerning leftward (or "sinister") movements.

Plot summary
This book takes place in a fictitious European city known as Padukgrad, where a government arises following the rise of a philosophy known as "Ekwilism", which discourages the idea of anyone being different from anyone else, and promotes the state as the prominent good in society. The story begins with the protagonist, Adam Krug, who had just lost his wife to an unsuccessful surgery. He is quickly asked to sign and deliver a speech to the leader of the new government by the head of the university and his colleagues, but he refuses. This government is led by a man named Paduk and his "Party of the Average Man". As it happens, the world-renowned philosopher Adam Krug was, in his youth, a classmate of Paduk, at which period he had bullied him and referred to him disparagingly as "the Toad". Paduk arrests many of the people close to Krug and those against his Ekwilist philosophy, and attempts to get the influential Professor Krug to promote the state philosophy to help stomp out dissent and increase his personal prestige.

Paduk tries to entice Krug with various offers, but Krug always refuses, even after his friends and acquaintances, like Ember, are incarcerated. Finally, Paduk orders the kidnapping of Krug's young son, David, for a ransom. After Krug capitulates and is prepared to promote the Ekwilist philosophy, Paduk promises David's safe return. However, when David is to be returned to him, Krug is horrified to find that the child he is presented is not his son. There has been a mix-up, and David has been sent to an orphanage that doubles as a violent prisoner rehabilitation clinic where he was killed when offered as a "release" to the prisoners.

Paduk makes an offer to allow Krug to personally kill those responsible, but he swears at the officials and is locked in a large prison cell. Another offer is made to Krug to free 24 opponents of Ekwilism, including many of his friends, in exchange for doing so. Krug refuses and begins to charge at Paduk and is killed by a pair of bullets from the dictator's henchmen. At this point, Nabokov feels such pity for Krug that he actually intervenes and emphasizes that Bend Sinister was, thankfully, a fictional story and that Adam Krug never existed.

Characters
 – University philosopher and protagonist. Krug is the foremost writer and thinker of Padukgrad. His cooperation with and endorsement of the Party of the Average Man is crucial to the regime's international relations.

 – Adam's late wife, who dies right before the novel begins.

 – Adam's son, who is killed by Padukgrad criminals in a mix-up.

 – Nicknamed "The Toad", he is the dictator of Padukgrad, former schoolmate of Krug and founder of Ekwilism.

 –  A Padukgrad intellectual who studies Shakespeare and is Adam's best friend.

 – The Krugs' housemaid, sent by Paduk to spy on Adam and David. She flirts with the elder Krug often and manages to seduce him.

Background

Publication history
Nabokov, who was teaching at Wellesley College at the time, first began writing Bend Sinister in 1942 while the greater part was composed in the winter and spring of 1945–1946, soon after the completion of World War II. The novel's title was quite volatile, as Nabokov originally titled it The Person from Porlock before soon electing for Game is Gunm. It would undergo further changes, to Solus Rex, before finally settling on the current name. The manuscript was sent to Allen Tate, an editor at Henry Holt, in the early summer of 1947 and published shortly after, on June 12, 1947.

Influences
During the war against the Axis powers and after their downfall, a new wave of pro-USSR sentiment swept America, as the Soviet Armed Forces had played a large role in the Allied victory, which deeply disturbed Nabokov, a fierce opponent of Communism. Brian Boyd writes that Nabokov wrote the novel in "an attempt to show that Nazi Germany and Soviet Russia represented fundamentally the same brutish vulgarity inimical to everything most vulnerable and most valuable in human life". In February 1943, Nabokov would give an impassioned speech at a panel discussion at Wellesley, extolling the virtues of democracy while denouncing totalitarian states in the process:  Such influences aside, Nabokov was insistent in his aestheticism, disclaiming any interest in the "literature of social comment" and denying "automatic comparisons between Bend Sinister and Kafka's creations and Orwell's clichés".

Criticism

Reception
Of the reviews it did garner, reactions were generally mixed, perhaps best exemplified by The New Republics comments which called it "at once impressive, powerful and oddly exasperating."

The novel did receive a glowing review from The New York Times: "It will be too bad if this book fails to find an audience because the armed battle with tyrant states has ended. The war goes on, and the problem, the struggle of free thought against the totalitarian state, is still with us. No one reads Bend Sinister can blink it away." Furthermore, the editor Nabokov sent the original manuscript to, Allen Tate, deeply admired the work, calling it "the only first rate piece of literature that I have had the privilege of reading as an editor". Tate admired the work so much that he wrote the blurb for the novel, concluding in it that the "mastery of English prose exhibited [in Bend Sinister] has not been surpassed by any writer of our generation who was born to English".

Brian Boyd, writing in his book Vladimir Nabokov: The American Years, praises the "jarring self-consciousness" and "inventiveness and challenge of particular passages" in the novel, he concludes that Bend Sinister "does not reward us enough as we read to justify all its difficulties and disruptions".

However, it has received retrospective praise from a number of contemporary critics. The Forward wrote "Bend Sinister, for all its shortcomings, evinces an unnerving prescience that reminds us of our proximity to a darker past, but also our ability to overcome it. It is one of Nabokov’s finest statements on the fight to reclaim freedom and individualism against the pressures of mass culture and victimization."

Film
A black and white German television adaptation was made in West Germany in 1970. It was directed by Herbert Vesely and starred Helmut Käutner as Adam Krug and Heinrich Schweiger as Paduk.

References

Sources
, 
, 

1947 American novels
American novels adapted into films
American novels adapted into television shows
Dystopian novels
Novels by Vladimir Nabokov
Henry Holt and Company books
Russian novels adapted into films
Russian novels adapted into television shows